Euplynes is a genus of beetles in the family Carabidae, containing the following species:

 Euplynes abyssinicus Mateu, 1974
 Euplynes apicalis Darlington, 1952
 Euplynes apicefumatus Mateu, 1974
 Euplynes aurocinctus Bates, 1889
 Euplynes balthasari Jedlicka, 1935
 Euplynes batesi Harold, 1877
 Euplynes bicoloripennis Burgeon, 1937
 Euplynes bredoi Burgeon, 1942
 Euplynes brosseti Mateu, 1974
 Euplynes brunneus Straneo, 1943
 Euplynes burgeoni Basilewsky, 1946
 Euplynes callidiodes (Chaudoir, 1879)
 Euplynes cyanipennis Schmidt-Goebel, 1846
 Euplynes decoloratus Baehr, 2000
 Euplynes dispar (Peringuey, 1896)
 Euplynes ghesquierei Burgeon, 1937
 Euplynes guttatus Andrewes, 1930
 Euplynes laetus Darlington, 1952
 Euplynes lebistinoides Burgeon, 1937
 Euplynes limbipennis Bates, 1889
 Euplynes marginatus Andrewes, 1923
 Euplynes miyakei Habu, 1974
 Euplynes nidicola Burgeon, 1937
 Euplynes nigripes (Fairmaire, 1901)
 Euplynes punctatus Mateu, 1974
 Euplynes splendidulus Landin, 1955
 Euplynes viridis Andrewes, 1933
 Euplynes wittei Burgeon, 1937

References

Platyninae